The Roman Catholic Diocese of Dinajpur is a diocese located in Dinajpur District, Rajshahi Division, in the Ecclesiastical province of Dhaka in Bangladesh.

History
 May 25, 1927: Established as Diocese of Dinajpur from the Diocese of Krishnagar

Bishops
 Bishops of Dinajpur (Roman rite)
 Bishop Santino Taveggia, P.I.M.E. (1927 – 1928)
 Bishop Giovanni Battista Anselmo, P.I.M.E. (February 7, 1929 – October 16, 1947)
 Bishop Joseph Obert, P.I.M.E. (December 9, 1948 – September 5, 1968)
 Bishop Michael Rozario (September 5, 1968 – December 17, 1977), appointed Archbishop of Dacca
 Bishop Theotonius Gomes, C.S.C. (December 19, 1978 – February 23, 1996)
 Bishop Moses Costa, C.S.C. (July 5, 1996 – April 6, 2011), appointed Bishop of Chittagong
 Bishop Sebastian Tudu (October 29, 2011 – present)

Other priest of this diocese who became bishop
Gervas Rozario (priest here, 1980–1990), appointed Bishop of Rajshahi in 2007

References
 GCatholic.org
 Catholic Hierarchy

Roman Catholic dioceses in Bangladesh
Christian organizations established in 1927
Roman Catholic dioceses and prelatures established in the 20th century
Dinajpur, Roman Catholic Diocese of